Rhopalessa pilosicollis  is a species of beetle in the family Cerambycidae. It was described by Zajciw in 1966.

References

Rhinotragini
Beetles described in 1966